DYFE (97.5 FM) is a radio station owned and operated by Far East Broadcasting Company. Its studio and transmitter are located at P. Burgos St., Tacloban City. It broadcasts every Monday to Sunday, 5:00 AM to 8:00 PM.

The frequency was formerly owned by Radio GMA under the brand Campus Radio. On March 31, 2010, it closed down due to lack of advertisers' support and financial problems. A few years later, it was used by FEBC for emergency broadcasts and relayer of DYFR and DZAS. On May 22, 2018, it was inaugurated as DYFE.

References

Radio stations in Tacloban
Christian radio stations in the Philippines
Radio stations established in 1995
1995 establishments in the Philippines
Far East Broadcasting Company